Lysyl oxidase homolog 1, also known as LOXL1, is an enzyme which in humans is encoded by the LOXL1 gene.

Function 

This gene encodes a member of the lysyl oxidase gene family. The prototypic member of the family is essential to the biogenesis of connective tissue, encoding an extracellular copper-dependent amine oxidase that catalyses the first step in the formation of crosslinks in collagens and elastin. A highly conserved amino acid sequence at the C-terminus end appears to be sufficient for amine oxidase activity, suggesting that each family member may retain this function. The N-terminus is poorly conserved and may impart additional roles in developmental regulation, senescence, tumor suppression, cell growth control, and chemotaxis to each member of the family.

Clinical significance 

Polymorphisms of the LOXL1 gene are associated with pseudoexfoliation syndrome, a disease where the extracellular matrix contains abnormal amounts of cross-linked, amyloid-like fibrillar material and glycoproteins. When this happens in the eye, exfoliation glaucoma results.

Interactions 
LOXL1 has been shown to interact with FBLN5.

See also 
 LOXL2
 LOXL3
 LOXL4

References

Further reading 

 
 
 
 
 
 
 
 
 
 
 
 
 

Lysyl oxidases